Black triangle may refer to one of the following:

 Black triangle (badge), a Nazi concentration camp badge worn by inmates deemed "asocial"
 Lesbian or feminist symbol reclaimed from the Nazi use
 Angularis nigra, triangular gap between teeth
 Black triangle (pharmacovigilance), suffixed to the trade name of British medicines when the drug is new on the market
 Black triangle (UFO), a type of UFO
 Black triangle, several code points in Unicode Geometric Shapes

Places 
 Black Triangle (region), the nickname for one of Europe's most polluted areas, where Germany, Poland and the Czech Republic meet
 The nickname given to the area south of Montreal worst affected by a long term blackout during the North American ice storm of 1998